Rajeev Institute of Technology (RIT), is a private technical co-educational engineering college located in Hassan, Karnataka. It is one of the renowned and reputed Institution among the four Engineering colleges in Hassan City.
It was started as one in the galaxy of Technical Colleges in the year 2008. Rajeev Institute of Technology in Hassan was established under the aegis of Rajeev Education Trust.
The institution is affiliated with the Visvesvaraya Technological University, Belagavi.
The college is built on a campus of about 21 acres and is a technical education center with well equipped infrastructure.

Facilities

Library 
The institution has a spacious library with a seating capacity for 150 students. It has 12000 volumes of books with 1275 titles. 47 national and 16 international journals are available in the library.

Hostel 
Separate hostels for boys and girls are provided. Boys Hostel is located inside the campus with the capacity over 500 and Girls Hostel is located inside the Hassan City with the capacity over 250. Regular college buses will be running between Hostel to prominent localities of the city.

Medical facilities 
The trust is running a 300-bed hospital at Hassan and medical facility will be provided to the students and staff. The doctors will be visiting to the college.

Transport 
Rajeev Education Trust maintains a fleet of vehicles including several buses to transport students to their respective study centers and to their respective hostels. The transport facility is also provided to students and the staff of the colleges from different places of Hassan and surrounding area. The buses are also provided to the students for University related works, fests and for sports and cultural competitions held in different colleges.

Canteen 
The college is running a canteen ("Santhrupthi") to cater to the needs of students, staff and visitors

Wi-fi 
The campus is Wi-fi enabled.

Academic units and programs 
Rajeev institute of Technology offers undergraduate Bachelor of Engineering (B.E) programmes in six disciplines and Post Graduate programmes in three disciplines, namely:

Achievements

Academic 
Vanada N Bidare, Dept of Civil Engineering, secured University third rank during VTU 17th annual convocation)
Chethan Kumar M, Dept of Mechanical Engineering has topped university in third semester examinations Dec-2010/Jan-2011 (777 out of 900)

Deepthi S.S, Dept of Electronics and Communication Engineering and Wilma Julius, Dept of Electrical and Electronics has scored 125 out 125 marks in Engineering Mathematics-IV exam, June–July 2011

Placements 
The college offers good placements for students.  The Placement Cell is working with a goal of 100% placement for eligible candidates. 'Mr. Sanjay Kumar A C', Training and Placement officer (TPO), is the current placement officer. Companies to which students got placed are Persistent Systems Pvt.Ltd, Continental, HCL, TCS, Wipro, Infosys, Capgemini, Cognizant, Mindtree, Innominds, KPIT, Zensar, PEOL Technologies, Mahindra Aerospace, Hexaware, EY etc.

MoUs 
Rajeev Institute of Technology has recently signed a Memorandum of Understanding (MoU) with 'ICT Academy', for providing assistance in Training and Skill development as well as Placement assistance for Management Vertical.

References 

Engineering colleges in Karnataka
Affiliates of Visvesvaraya Technological University
All India Council for Technical Education
Universities and colleges in Hassan district